Khalil Haider is a Pakistani ghazal singer. He became famous after singing a famous poet Nasir Kazmi's ghazal song, Nai kapre pehen ker jaooN kahaN in 1990. He has also performed as a singer in UK, Canada. and United States. Besides Nasir Kazmi's ghazals, he also uses poet Mohsin Naqvi's poems.

Early life and career

He was born on 4 May 1965 in village Lakhanwal, Jalalpur Jattan, District Gujrat Punjab, Pakistan. He received his primary education there. In 1980, he moved to Lahore with his family. Ustad Sadiq Husain trained him in classical music. He has sung many ghazals of several Pakistani poets. He has also performed on the Pakistani TV shows, and he visited UK, Canada, and the United States for his successful ghazal performances. He has also sung in Pakistani films as a playback singer including the film Anhoni (1993). A popular female singers group triple S sisters (Sana, Shereen, Saba) were his sisters.

Performances in live public concerts
 In 2012, Khalil Haider performed in a live concert called Ghazal Night at Pakistan National Council of the Arts in Islamabad along with  other noted ghazal singers of Pakistan Ghulam Ali, Humaira Channa and Saira Nasim.

Top Albums
10 Top Albums by Khalil Haider, including the four listed below, are shown on this website:
 Gila - released in 1992 [Oriental Star Agency (OSA) Label]
 Khed Naseeban Dee - released in 1994 (Punjabi language songs by Khalil Haider)
 Tumhara Pyar - released in 2001 [Oriental Star Agency (OSA) Label]
 Preet (Geet & Ghazal)- released in 2010 (Hi-Tech Music Label)

Songs only from above album Preet (Geet & Ghazal) (2010)

 Kya Tujhe Preet Ho Gayi
 Tujhe Udas Bhi Karna Tha
 Gali Gali Meri Yaad
 Jante Boojhte Kanton Se'''
 Woh Koi Anhoni Ka Teri Aankhon Mein Jo Nami Yun Toh Peete Hain Sabhi Mekashi Jurm Hai Taza Mohabbaton Ka Nasha Aa Toh Jaate Hain''

See also
 List of Pakistani ghazal singers

References

External links
 TV Interview on YouTube
  Khalil Haider ghazals on play.google.com website
 Filmography of Khalil Haider on IMDb website
 Khalil Haider's songs in Punjabi language on Academy of the Punjab in North America (APNA) website

1965 births
Living people
Pakistani ghazal singers
20th-century Pakistani male singers
Pakistani playback singers
Pakistani classical singers
People from Gujrat District